Mychell Ruan da Silva Chagas (born 6 June 1989), commonly known as Mychell Chagas, is a Brazilian professional footballer who plays as a forward.

Club career
On 22 December 2017 he would join second tier football club Servette. He would go on to win the 2018–19 Swiss Challenge League division with the club and promotion to the top tier.

Career statistics

Club

Notes

Honours

Club
FC Rapperswil-Jona
 Swiss Promotion League: 2016–17

Servette FC
 Swiss Challenge League: 2018–19

References

External links

1989 births
Living people
Brazilian footballers
Brazilian expatriate footballers
Association football forwards
SC Young Fellows Juventus players
FC Zürich players
FC Winterthur players
FC Grenchen players
FC Rapperswil-Jona players
Servette FC players
Grasshopper Club Zürich players
Nantong Zhiyun F.C. players
PSS Sleman players
Swiss Challenge League players
Swiss Promotion League players
Swiss Super League players
China League One players
Liga 1 (Indonesia) players
Brazilian expatriate sportspeople in Switzerland
Expatriate footballers in Switzerland
Expatriate footballers in China
Brazilian expatriate sportspeople in China
Expatriate footballers in Indonesia
Brazilian expatriate sportspeople in Indonesia
Sportspeople from Recife